Ontochariesthes unicolor is a species of beetle in the family Cerambycidae. It was described by Stephan von Breuning in 1953. It is known from Namibia and Angola.

References

Tragocephalini
Beetles described in 1953